Capital punishment in North Macedonia is prohibited by its Constitution.

The 1991 (amended in 2001) Constitution of North Macedonia at Art. 10 states:

"The human right to life is irrevocable. The death penalty shall not be imposed on any grounds whatsoever in the Republic of Macedonia."

North Macedonia is a member of the Council of Europe. It has also signed and ratified Protocol no.13.

Executions since 1959
Source: SPSK Database

References

 

North Macedonia
Human rights abuses in North Macedonia